Jimpster (a.k.a. Audiomontage, a.k.a. Franc Spangler, real name Jamie Odell) is a British deep house producer and DJ. Together with Tom Roberts, he founded the labels Freerange Records and Delusions of Grandeur. While producing his own tracks and playing live shows, Jimpster has also worked on remixes, including a remix of the song 400 years by Bob Marley.

History
Born into a musical family, Jimpster was influenced and encouraged by his father Roger Odell who is the drummer in the jazz-funk band Shakatak. It was there that he was first exposed to electronic synthesizers and recording equipment at around age 10. He also has two children named Stan & Spike (Aged 16 & 13) He started Freerange records in 1996, a label that has since found a niche in deep house with artists like Shur-I-Kan and Milton Jackson. Jimpster played in a live electronica band, The Bays, from 2002 until 2007, but eventually decided to focus on djing and his record label.

In 2007 his label Freerange was voted Best British Label by Dj Mag, in 2010 he won the Beatport titles: Best Deep House Producer and Best Deep House Remix of the year.

Discography

Studio albums
Martian Arts (1997), Instinct Ambient
Messages From the Hub (1999), Kudos
Live At Soundofspeed (2000), Soundofspeed
Domestic Science (2002), Kudos
Amour (2006), Freerange Records
Porchlight and Rocking Chairs (2013), Freerange Records
Silent Stars (2017), Freerange Records

Singles and EPs
Initial EP (1996), Freerange Records
Interconnect EP (1997), Kudos
Deepdown EP (2001), Kudos
Martian Arts (1996), Freerange Records
Perennial Pleasures (1997), Kudos
Seeing Is Believing (2000), Kudos
State of Mind (2002), Kudos
Armour LP Sampler (2006), Freerange
Square Up (2006), Buzzin' Fly Records
Dangly Panther (2008), Freerange Records
Sleeper (2009), Freerange Records
Forever And A Day EP (2010), Delusions of Grandeur
Painted Lady EP (2014), Delusions of Grandeur
The Sun Comes Up (2017), Freerange
Crave (2017), Freerange
Burning Up / Becoming Cyclonic (2018), Burn
Curve EP (2018), Freerange

Compilations
Special Double Artist Ten Inch Set (1997), Instinct Ambient
Scrambled (2000), Shadow Records

References

External links

British DJs
Deep house musicians
Acid jazz musicians
British electronic musicians
Electronic dance music DJs